Kismet is a ghost town in Lake County, Florida, in an area which is now part of the Ocala National Forest. It was founded in 1884 by the Kismet Land and Improvement company and was a citrus town. During the late 1800s, the St. John's and Eustis Railroad had planned to extend a line into Kismet, but the Great Freeze drove many residents to leave. Nothing remains of the town today. The town is best known as the place where Elias Disney and his wife Flora were married. Their son, Walt Disney, visited as a child.

The community had a large, 50-room hotel which was dismantled and moved from Kismet to Eustis, Florida in 1910.

External links 

 Ghosttowns.com

References 

Ghost towns in Florida
Geography of Lake County, Florida
1884 establishments in Florida